A number of elections for the renewal of both municipal councils and mayors were held in Italy on 28 and 29 May 2006. Notably, these election regarded the four biggest cities in the country, Rome, Milan, Naples and Turin. Other relevant cities where municipal elections were held included Cagliari, Varese, Novara, Ravenna, Rimini, Ancona, Siena, Salerno and Catanzaro.

Municipal elections

Provincial elections 

2006 elections in Italy
 
 
Municipal elections in Italy
May 2006 events in Europe